Liu Zhenli (born August 1964) is a general (3 star) (Shangjiang) of the People's Liberation Army (PLA), currently serving as chief of staff of the Joint Staff Department of the Central Military Commission. He was commander of the People's Liberation Army Ground Force from June 2021 to December 2022.

He is a member of the 19th Central Committee of the Communist Party of China. He was a delegate to the 12th National People's Congress.

Biography
Liu was born in Luancheng County, Hebei, in August 1964. He enlisted in the People's Liberation Army in September 1983 and joined the Communist Party of China in April 1984. He graduated from the PLA National Defence University.

In 1986, he participated in the Sino-Vietnamese conflicts (1979–1991). In the war, he and his men successfully defended the line against repeated the People's Army of Vietnam assaults for 36 times.

He was chief of staff of the 65th Group Army in December 2009, commander of the army in February 2012, and commander of the 38th Group Army in March 2014. 

He was transferred to the People's Armed Police in July 2015 and appointed chief of staff. 

In December 2015, he became the first chief of staff of the newly reshuffled People's Liberation Army Ground Force. In June 2021, he was made commander of the army.

In September 2022, he was commissioned as chief of staff of the Joint Staff Department of the Central Military Commission.

He was promoted to the rank of major general (Shaojiang) in December 2010, lieutenant general (Zhongjiang) in July 2016, and general (Shangjiang) in July 2021.

References

1964 births
Living people
People from Shijiazhuang
PLA National Defence University alumni
People's Liberation Army generals from Hebei
Delegates to the 12th National People's Congress
Members of the 19th Central Committee of the Chinese Communist Party